WPPY (92.7 FM, "Happy 92.7") is a commercial radio station licensed to serve Starview, Pennsylvania. The station is owned by Forever Media.

WPPY's studios and offices are located at 275 Radio Road, Hanover, Pennsylvania. The station's service contour covers the cities of York and Harrisburg.

History
On June 23, 1971, the Federal Communications Commission granted Capital Media, Inc., a construction permit for a new station on 92.7 MHz. The station was assigned the WRHY call sign on September 7, 1971, and signed on for the first time on November 22, 1971. WRHY was granted its first license by the FCC on January 20, 1972.

By 1974, the station was airing a progressive rock format. On May 13, 1976, the FCC granted a voluntary assignment of the station's license from Capital Media, Inc., to Harrea Broadcasters, Inc.

By 1980, the station's format had shifted to AOR. In 1982, the format changed to "contemporary".

The station's license was voluntarily transferred from Harrea Broadcasters, Inc., to Starview Media, Inc., on July 27, 1983. On August 12, 1983, the station switched call signs to WHTF. Its format changed to contemporary hit radio/top 40 branded as 92 Rock. The format evolved toward classic rock over the next two years, and by the summer of 1985, the station's branding changed to Starview 92, then Starview 92.7.

In the early 1990s, the station switched to an active rock format and re-branded as Solid Rock 92.7. On November 13, 1995, Hall Communications, Inc., announced the purchase of station. The sale consummated on January 16, 1996.

On February 23, 1996, the station returned to the classic rock format, changing the call sign to WEGK and re-branding as 92.7 The Eagle.

On June 6, 2001, the station switched its call sign to WHBO and its format to oldies as "Big Oldies" 92.7 , followed by another call sign change on March 1, 2004, to WSJW and a format change to smooth jazz.

On July 29, 2011, the station abruptly dropped its Smooth Jazz format and began stunting, mainly with cover versions of Led Zeppelin's "Stairway to Heaven". The following message was displayed on the station's website:

On August 1, 2011, the station changed its call sign to WKZF, returning to classic rock, and re-branding as 92.7 WKZF, with the first song being "Stairway to Heaven" by Led Zeppelin. Rick Everett, former Hall Communications operations manager of Cat Country 98.1 WCTK in Providence, Rhode Island, was hired as a consultant for the transition. The syndicated The Free Beer and Hot Wings Show aired weekday mornings.

On September 1, 2014, WKZF changed its call sign to WLPA-FM, in anticipation of its format change to sports radio from ESPN Radio, which took place at midnight on September 3, 2014.

On December 2, 2015, the WLPA-FM call sign was changed to WONN-FM.

On July 23, 2021, it was announced that Forever Media would purchase WONN-FM along with WLPA and its translator for a total of $400,000. This signals Hall Communications' withdrawal from the market, as the sale of 101.3 WROZ to religious broadcaster Educational Media Foundation was announced earlier that month.

The sale was consummated on October 15, 2021. WONN-FM simultaneously switched to a Top 40 (CHR) format. The station’s call sign changed to WNUU on November 1, 2021.

On November 1, 2022, WNUU dropped its top 40 (CHR) format and began stunting with Christmas music, branded as "Santa 92.7", with a new format to launch in January.

The station applied to change its callsign to WPPY, effective January 1, 2023. On that date, WPPY launched an adult contemporary format branded as "Happy 92.7".

References

External links
 

PPY
Radio stations established in 1971
1971 establishments in Pennsylvania
Mainstream adult contemporary radio stations in the United States